Wilson Bryan Key Ph.D. (January 31, 1925 – October 8, 2008) was the author of several books about subliminal messages and subliminal advertising.

Career
Key obtained his doctorate in communications from the University of Denver and taught journalism for a short period of time at the University of Western Ontario. He was a colleague and friend of Marshall McLuhan.

A US court case in 1990 accused the English Heavy Metal Band Judas Priest of causing suicide through subliminal messaging. Key advised the plaintiffs lawyer to hire Bill Nickloff, an audio engineer, to find the subliminal messaging. The judge found that the defendant was not responsible for the deaths.

Death
Key died following complications resulting from surgery. He is interred at the Northern Nevada Veterans Memorial Cemetery in Fernley, Nevada.

Criticism
His results and conclusions have been challenged, in books including the following:
 
  Reprinted in Encounters with the Paranormal: Science, Knowledge, and Belief, edited by Kendrick Frazier, Prometheus Books, 1998, 253–263. 
  Reprinted in Encounters with the Paranormal: Science, Knowledge, and Belief, edited by Kendrick Frazier, Prometheus Books, 1998, 240–252.

Bibliography

 Subliminal Seduction: Are You Being Sexually Aroused By This Picture? a.k.a. Ad Media's Manipulation of a Not So Innocent America (1974). Introduction by Marshall McLuhan. Prentice-Hall, Inc. Library of Congress Catalog Card Number: .
 Media Sexploitation (1976). Prentice-Hall, Inc. 
 The Clam-Plate Orgy: And Other Subliminal Techniques for Manipulating Your Behavior (1980). Signet.
 reissued as Subliminal Ad-Ventures in Erotic Art (1992). Branden Books. 
 The Age of Manipulation: The Con in Confidence, The Sin in Sincere (1989). H. Holt.

See also
 Programming the Nation?

Further reading
 The Secret Sales Pitch: An Overview of Subliminal Advertising (2004), by August Bullock. Norwich Publishers. .

References

External links
 The Straight Dope: "Are subliminal messages secretly embedded in advertisements?" (1987)
 Wilson Bryan Key's words? Or Joan Peyser's?
 Interview with Wilson Bryan Key. Source Material for Brainwash: The Secret History of Mind Control (by phone, March 27, 2005)

1925 births
2008 deaths
People from Richmond, California
Mind control theorists
Academic staff of the University of Western Ontario
University of Denver alumni
20th-century American non-fiction writers
American male writers
Male non-fiction writers
20th-century American male writers